Lucious Irvin Smith (born January 17, 1957, in Fort Benning, Columbus, Georgia) is a former American football cornerback in the National Football League. He was signed by the Los Angeles Rams as an undrafted free agent in 1980. He played college football at Cal State-Fullerton and San Diego State.

Smith also played for the Kansas City Chiefs, Buffalo Bills, and San Diego Chargers.

External links 

 

1957 births
Living people
Players of American football from Columbus, Georgia
American football cornerbacks
Cal State Fullerton Titans football players
San Diego State Aztecs football players
Los Angeles Rams players
Kansas City Chiefs players
Buffalo Bills players
San Diego Chargers players